Dhurwara Dam is a proposed dam on the Betwa River in district Lalitpur, Uttar Pradesh.

References

Dams in Uttar Pradesh
Lalitpur district, India
Proposed dams in India